The tomb of Antony and Cleopatra is the undiscovered burial crypt of Mark Antony and Cleopatra VII from 30 BCE assumed to be located near Alexandria, Egypt. According to historians Suetonius and Plutarch, the Roman leader Octavian permitted their burial together after he had defeated them. Their surviving children were taken to Rome, to be raised as Roman citizens.

References to the tomb in history
Throughout history many references to the tomb of Antony and Cleopatra have been made.

Shakespeare's Antony and Cleopatra

Shakespeare, inspired by Plutarch, briefly alludes to this common entombment in the voice of his character Caesar (Octavian), in the last verses of his play Antony and Cleopatra (Act V, scene II):

Search for the tomb
Many searches for the tomb of Antony and Cleopatra have taken place.

Taposiris Magna excavation

Reports in 2008 and 2009 focused on an announcement by the noted Egyptologist Zahi Hawass that he might find the tomb in Taposiris Magna, a temple to Osiris, located west of Alexandria, Egypt. Excavations carried out by Kathleen Martínez have yielded ten mummies in 27 tombs of Egyptian nobles, as well as coins bearing images of Cleopatra and carvings showing the two in an embrace. So far, the tomb itself remains elusive, but the temple excavations continue, with additional sites below the surface identified using ground-penetrating radar in 2011.

In January 2019, controversy arose over the possibility that the discovery of the tombs was imminent, attributed to remarks by Zahi Hawass at a conference at the University of Palermo. The Egyptologist denied the news in an article in the newspaper Al-Ahram, affirming that the thesis that the tombs were in Taposiris Magna was not his but that of Kathleen Martínez, and that he did not believe Martínez' hypothesis because "the Egyptians never buried inside a temple", given that "the temples were for worshiping, and this was for the goddess Isis. It is therefore unlikely that Cleopatra was buried there."

In early November 2022 the team of archaeologists lead by Martínez identified a 1,300 meter long tunnel in the area of ​​the temple of Taposiris Magna, west of Alexandria, that could lead to Cleopatra's tomb.

The search seeks to find Antony's mummy as well, despite Plutarch's statement that Antony was cremated: "After Cleopatra had heard this, in the first place, she begged Caesar that she might be permitted to pour libations for Antony; and when the request was granted, she had herself carried to the tomb, and embracing the urn which held his ashes."

See also
Early life of Cleopatra
Reign of Cleopatra
Death of Cleopatra

References

Cleopatra
Mark Antony
Mausoleums in Egypt
Monuments and memorials to women
Tombs of ancient Egypt